Ryan Wade Hawblitzel (born April 30, 1971) is an American former professional baseball right-handed pitcher.

Drafted by the Chicago Cubs in the 2nd round of the 1990 Major League Baseball draft. Hawblitzel would make his Major League Baseball (MLB) debut with the Colorado Rockies on June 9, 1996, and appeared in his final game on August 5, 1996.

High school career
Hawblitzel attended John I. Leonard High School in Lake Worth, Florida and graduated in 1990.   During his senior season, he finished with a 9-2 record, 133 strikeouts in 75 innings, and had a 1.38 earned-run average.  He also played shortstop where he led the district and regional champion Lancers (20-10) with a .386 batting average (32 for 83) and had 14 RBI, 27 runs scored, 10 doubles, one triple and two home runs.  Hawblitzel was named Sun-Sentinel Class 3A-4A Player of the Year.  He was also named to the first team on the Class 4A all-state team as a utility player.

References

External links

Pelota Binaria

1971 births
Living people
American expatriate baseball players in Canada
Baseball players from Florida
Charlotte Knights players
Colorado Rockies players
Colorado Springs Sky Sox players
Edmonton Trappers players
Huntington Cubs players
Indian River State Pioneers baseball players
Major League Baseball pitchers
Pastora de los Llanos players
American expatriate baseball players in Venezuela
Scranton/Wilkes-Barre Red Barons players
Sportspeople from West Palm Beach, Florida
Winston-Salem Spirits players